John Edward Swindler (May 12, 1944 – June 18, 1990) was an American murderer and suspected serial killer who was executed by the state of Arkansas for the 1976 murder of Patrolman Randy Basnett. He was also convicted of the murders of two teenagers: Greg Becknell and Dorothy Rhodes, in Columbia, South Carolina, and was charged but never convicted of the murder of Jeffrey McNerney in Florida. Swindler was the first person to be executed by the state of Arkansas since 1961, and is the only person to have been executed in the electric chair in Arkansas since the reinstatement of capital punishment in 1976.

Murder  
John Edward Swindler shot and killed Patrolman Randy Basnett in the afternoon of September 24, 1976. Officer Basnett had stopped at a service station at the Kelly Highway exit in Fort Smith, Arkansas, when Swindler also stopped there in a stolen car with a South Carolina license plate. Swindler was returning to Leavenworth, Kansas to settle some personal grudges that had arisen when he had been imprisoned there. Passing the I-540 exit on I-40 near Van Buren, Arkansas, the illiterate Swindler became confused and exited, driving across the Arkansas River and into Fort Smith. That morning, Basnett had been briefed to be on the lookout for Swindler, who was the suspect in the double murders of teenagers Gregory L. Becknell and Dorothy Ann Rhodes in South Carolina and other felonies in Georgia and South Carolina. The briefing contained information about Swindler's description, the car he was thought to be driving, and the fact that he was considered to be armed and dangerous. After he noted Swindler and the stolen car, Basnett radioed dispatchers that Swindler was at the service station. Back-up officers were immediately dispatched to his location.

Before additional help arrived, Officer Basnett approached Swindler's car and asked for identification. Without warning, Swindler pulled a revolver and shot Basnett twice in the chest. Basnett, who was standing beside the car, returned fire before collapsing, slightly wounding Swindler. Swindler attempted to flee, but being unfamiliar with Fort Smith, took a road that trailed off into a dead end in a soybean field on the Arkansas River. He was captured there within minutes by police officers who had answered Basnett's call. When officers arrested Swindler, he had several weapons and hundreds of rounds of ammunition in his possession. 

Basnett died in the ambulance on the way to Sparks Regional Medical Center.

Execution 
A legislative act in 1983 made lethal injection the only method of execution in Arkansas. However, inmates who had been sentenced to death before the legislation was adopted were allowed to choose between lethal injection and electrocution. When Charles Laverne Singleton chose lethal injection, Swindler earned the distinction of being the last inmate to die in Arkansas' electric chair.

Swindler refused to choose between lethal injection and the electric chair, according to the Arkansas Department of Correction. By not choosing, Swindler effectively selected electrocution. Warden David White said Swindler might have wanted the notoriety of being the last Arkansas inmate to die in the electric chair. His was also the only execution in the new electric chair constructed by the state in the 1970s.

Swindler was the first person executed by the state of Arkansas since Furman v. Georgia, after new capital punishment laws were passed in Arkansas and came into force on March 23, 1973.

After the Swindler execution, electrocution was made available to inmates who chose it. Further legislation stipulated that electrocution is authorized, but only if lethal injection is found unconstitutional.

See also 
 Capital punishment in Arkansas
 Capital punishment in the United States
 List of people executed in Arkansas

References 

1944 births
1976 murders in the United States
1990 deaths
20th-century executions by Arkansas
20th-century executions of American people
American people convicted of kidnapping
American people executed for murdering police officers
Male murderers
People convicted of murder by Arkansas
People convicted of murder by South Carolina
People executed by Arkansas by electric chair
Prisoners sentenced to life imprisonment by South Carolina
Suspected serial killers